Lorraine Adams is an American journalist and novelist. As a journalist, she is known as a contributor to the New York Times Book Review, and a former contributor to The Washington Post. As a novelist, she is known for the award-winning Harbor and its follow-up, The Room and the Chair.

Early life
Lorraine Adams graduated magna cum laude with an A.B. in English from Princeton University in 1981 after completing a 76-page-long senior thesis titled "The Hero in Ezra Pound's Cantos." She then attended Columbia University, graduating with an M.A. in English and American Literature in 1982.

Career

Journalism
She was a staff writer for The Washington Post, and The Dallas Morning News.

She regularly contributes to the New York Times Book Review, and is a fellow at the John Simon Guggenheim Memorial Foundation.

Adams and Dan Malone of The Dallas Morning News shared the 1992 Pulitzer Prize for Investigative Reporting, citing "reporting that charged Texas police with extensive misconduct and abuses of power", including rights violations.

Novels
Her first novel was published in 2004, Harbor, featuring North African Arab stowaways. It won accolades including Los Angeles Times Award for First Fiction, Virginia Commonwealth University First Novelist Award, and Entertainment Weekly Best Novel of 2004, and it made the New York Times Best Books of 2004 list.

Her second novel, The Room and the Chair, was published in 2010 and details the life of an American fighter pilot. The German-language edition is Crash (Zürich: Arche, 2011).

Amy Wilentz, reviewing The Room and the Chair in the Los Angeles Times, stated, "Lorraine Adams is a singular and important American writer. The Room and the Chair establishes this without question: It is remarkable for its ambitions and its achievements. It's a war novel, a reporter's novel and a psychological thriller. It encompasses the broadest outlines of our world. It is also Adams' second novel, and it is gutsier and throws a wider net than the topical and gorgeously written Harbor, her first. Both books are about U.S. involvement in the Middle East, about psychological and political blowback, about what happens when you wage a war and then suddenly it slaps you back, blindsides you."

Personal life
Adams lives in Harlem, New York and is married to the novelist Richard Price.

Awards
 1992 Pulitzer Prize for Investigative Reporting
 2006 VCU First Novelist Award
 2010 Guggenheim Fellowship

Selected works
 "Almost Famous", Washington Monthly, April 2002
 Harbor, Random House, Inc., 2005, 
 The Room and the Chair, Knopf, 2010, 
 NYC 22 "Block Party" July 2012

References

External links
"Turning Secret Intelligence to Fiction", The Wall Street Journal, ALEXANDRA ALTER, FEBRUARY 3, 2010
"Five Debut Novelists. One Rock 'n' Reading Tour.", Powell's
"The Leonard Lopate Show", WNYC, March 18, 2010
"Up Front", The New York Times, THE EDITORS, May 18, 2008
"Love, etc.: Authors Richard Price and Lorraine Adams wed", The Washington Post'', The Reliable Source, May 20, 2012
 

 

21st-century American novelists
Pulitzer Prize for Investigative Reporting winners
The Washington Post people
The Dallas Morning News people
American women novelists
Living people
Year of birth missing (living people)
Place of birth missing (living people)
American women journalists
Princeton University alumni
Columbia Graduate School of Arts and Sciences alumni
21st-century American women writers
21st-century American non-fiction writers
Refugees and displaced people in fiction